This is a list of notable events in music that took place in the year 1984.


Specific locations
1984 in British music
1984 in Norwegian music

Specific genres
1984 in country music
1984 in heavy metal music
1984 in hip hop music
1984 in jazz

Events

January–March
 In January 1984, Iain Williams & the 1984 Project recorded the dance track Love Is Suicide at Trident Studios in Soho, London. The track features Hans Zimmer on Fairlight CM and Alan Murphy on guitar.
January 11 – BBC Radio 1 DJ Mike Read announces on air that he will not play the single "Relax" by Frankie Goes to Hollywood because of its suggestive lyrics.  The BBC places a total ban on the record at about the same time.
January 17 – The SING BLUE SILVER tour continues on to Japan and North America as Duran Duran becomes the first act to utilize live video cameras and screens in their show. They break every existing merchandise record during this tour.
January 21 – "Relax" reaches number one in the UK singles chart, despite the BBC ban; it will spend a total of 42 weeks in the Top 40.
January 27 – Michael Jackson's scalp is burned during the filming of a Pepsi commercial and he is admitted to hospital. Around this time, Jackson also releases the title track from his album Thriller as the LP's final single.
February 14
Elton John marries studio engineer Renate Blauel.
Joe Perry and Brad Whitford attend an Aerosmith concert and re-join the band, which embarks on a reunion tour "Back in the Saddle" later in the year.
February 16 – Jerry Lee Lewis surrenders to federal authorities on charges of income tax evasion. Lewis is later acquitted.
February 25 – Thompson Twins debuts at number 1 on the UK Albums Chart with Into the Gap. The album would also top the chart the two following weeks and remain on the chart for 38 consecutive weeks until November.  
February 28
 Recovering from the scalp burns sustained a month earlier, Michael Jackson wins eight Grammy Awards out of twelve nominations at the 26th Annual Grammy Awards, breaking the record for the most Grammys won in a single year. He wins seven for the album Thriller (including Album of the Year and Record of the Year for "Beat It") and one for his work on the audiobook for the film E.T. the Extra-Terrestrial.
 Hosted by John Denver, this year's Grammys ceremony receives the highest ratings in the awarding body's history, a record currently unmatched. Along with the awards received by Michael Jackson, The Police's "Every Breath You Take" wins Song of the Year, while Culture Club win Best New Artist.
February 29 – German industrial band KMFDM is founded, and holds its first performance at the Grand Palais in Paris, France.
March 1 
Sting plays his last concerts with The Police at the end of the Synchronicity tour; the band takes a "pause" after the tour and only play a few special events together after this, until 2007, when they would organize a reunion tour.
Alice Cooper, who has not toured for his last two albums, parts ways with his longtime label Warner Bros. and goes on hiatus from the music industry. Cooper begins mulling over plans for a comeback, which he would carry out in 1986.

April–June
April 1 
New York rock and roll magazine Trouser Press folds after a decade, publishing its 96th and final issue.
In Los Angeles, Marvin Gaye is shot and killed during an argument with his father.
May 1 – Mick Fleetwood, of Fleetwood Mac, files for bankruptcy in the United States.
May 2 – Lionel Richie's hit "Hello" becomes Motown's first ever UK million-selling single.
May 5
Duran Duran achieve their second UK number 1 single with "The Reflex" and remain at number 1 for four consecutive weeks.  
The Pretenders singer Chrissie Hynde marries Simple Minds singer Jim Kerr.
In Luxembourg, the Eurovision Song Contest 1984 is won by the Swedish entry, "Diggi-Loo Diggi-Ley", performed by the Herreys.
June 8 – Billy Joel performs at Wembley Arena; the concert is later broadcast on BBC Television in two parts.
June 16 – Frankie Goes to Hollywood begin a nine-week stay at the top of the UK singles chart with "Two Tribes".
June 18 – At the climax of a Judas Priest concert at Madison Square Garden, fans begin ripping out the cushions from the seats and throwing them on stage. Judas Priest pay damages through insurance and are banned from Madison Square Garden for life over the incident.
June 23 – Duran Duran earn their first US number 1 single with "The Reflex", making it their first single to top both the UK and US charts.
June 25 – Prince releases his sixth album Purple Rain; the album sells over 20 million copies and gives Prince two US number one singles with "When Doves Cry" and "Let's Go Crazy".

July–September
July 1 – During his performance at the first ever Cornerstone Festival in Grayslake, Illinois, Steve Taylor jumps off the stage, breaking his ankle. Taylor hops back on stage and finishes his show. The next few shows on Taylor's tour were performed from a wheel chair.
July 10 – The last original member of Menudo, Ricky Meléndez, leaves the group and is replaced by Ricky Martin. Meanwhile, Menudomania reaches Asia in 1984.
July 14
Eddie Van Halen makes a special guest appearance at a concert by The Jacksons in Dallas, Texas, playing the guitar solo for "Beat It" live.
Selena y los Dinos release their first album Mis Primeras Grabaciones.
Boothill Foottappers enter the UK Singles Chart with their single released on the Go! Discs label.
August 9 – Iron Maiden kicks off the World Slavery Tour in Warsaw, Poland, with shows in Hungary and Yugoslavia soon to follow. This marks the first time a Western band has ever brought a full concert production behind the Iron Curtain.
August 10 – Red Hot Chili Peppers release their debut album The Red Hot Chili Peppers.
August 25 – Kathleen Battle makes her solo recital debut at the Salzburg Festival.
August 31 – Canadian music video channel MuchMusic begins broadcasting. The first video played is Rush's "The Enemy Within".
September 2 – Van Halen concludes its 1984 world tour with a show in Nuremberg, Germany as part of the Monsters of Rock festival tour. This would be the band's last concert with David Lee Roth as lead singer until 2007.
September 7 – Janet Jackson elopes with fellow singer James DeBarge. The marriage would be annulled in 1985.
September 11 – Country singer Barbara Mandrell suffers serious injuries in a head-on automobile collision on a Tennessee highway. She will make a comeback after spending over a year rehabilitating.
September 14 – The first annual MTV Video Music Awards are held in New York City. Herbie Hancock wins the most awards with five, and The Cars take the highest prize of Video Of The Year for "You Might Think". Much attention is garnered by Madonna's controversial performance of her hit single "Like a Virgin" in which she rolls around on the stage, revealing lacy stockings and garters, and grinds her crotch against her veil.
September 21 – The first compact disc manufacturing plant in North America opens in Terre Haute, Indiana. CDs have previously had to be expensively imported from Japan or West Germany. Bruce Springsteen's Born in the U.S.A. is designated as the first CD ever made in the United States.

October–December
October 1 – The Canadian music video series Video Hits premieres on CBC Television.
October 23 – A report on the Ethiopian famine by BBC journalist Michael Buerk is broadcast in the UK and receives an unprecedented public response.  Among those watching is Bob Geldof, who is inspired to release a charity record to raise money to help with famine relief.
October 26 – Turner Broadcasting System launches Cable Music Channel, a music video channel intended to compete directly with MTV. The first video played is "I Love L.A." by Randy Newman. The channel would only last 34 days.
November 5 – Bryan Adams releases his breakout album called Reckless, spawning multiple hit singles, achieving diamond certification in Canada and topping the charts in the United States.
November 20 – Michael Jackson receives a star on the Hollywood Walk of Fame directly in front of Mann's Chinese Theater. Jackson leaves after only three minutes at the request of security, as the crush of 5,000 onlookers becomes a safety concern.
November 23 - Tears for Fears releases the music Shout, from their second studio album, Songs From the Big Chair. Shout hit the US 1# Billboard Hot 100 in August 1985.
November 25 – The Band Aid single "Do They Know It's Christmas?" is recorded at SARM Studios in Notting Hill, London, by a gathering of performers that includes Paul Young, Simon Le Bon, Bono, Phil Collins, Paul Weller, Sting, Boy George and Tony Hadley.
November 28 – The Bring Me Sunshine charity concert at the London Palladium, in memory of Eric Morecambe, includes musical performances by Kenny Ball & His Jazzmen, Des O'Connor and Ernie Wise.
December – Tipper Gore forms the Parents Music Resource Center (PMRC) in response to the "filth" she hears on her daughter's copy of Prince's Purple Rain.
December 1 – Frankie Goes to Hollywood become the first act to take their first three singles to the UK #1 position since Gerry & The Pacemakers in 1963, when "The Power of Love" tops the chart.
December 3 – Bob Geldof and Band Aid release the single "Do They Know It's Christmas?", which becomes the fastest-selling single of all time in the UK.
December 8 
Mötley Crüe member Vince Neil is involved in a serious car accident. He is drunk at the time, and Razzle (Nicholas Dingley) of Hanoi Rocks is killed in the accident.
Cyndi Lauper, with the fourth single from her 1983 debut She's So Unusual, "All Through the Night", becomes the first woman in the 26-year history of the Billboard Hot 100 to have four singles from one album in the top five.
December 9 – The Jacksons conclude their Victory Tour with the last of six concerts at Dodger Stadium in Los Angeles. At the end of their final show, lead singer Michael Jackson surprises not only his fans, but also his band members with the announcement that he would be permanently leaving the Jacksons, stating that this would be the last time that they all performed together. The tour, which consisted of 55 shows over five months, has reportedly grossed $75 million, a new industry record. As for the Jacksons, they would release one more album in 1989 before splitting up, occasionally regrouping in the years afterward for reunion performances with and without Michael.
 December 11 – While on tour, Bucks Fizz's tour bus crashes. All members of the group are injured and member Mike Nolan suffers brain damage after falling into a coma.
December 13 – George Harrison makes a rare public appearance, joining Deep Purple on stage in Sydney, Australia for their encore rendition of "Lucille".
December 31
Def Leppard's drummer Rick Allen loses his left arm in a car wreck.
The thirteenth annual New Year's Rockin' Eve special airs on ABC, with appearances by Jermaine Jackson, Ronnie Milsap, Night Ranger, Scandal, John Waite and Barry Manilow.
UK singles sales this year are the second highest ever, after 1978.

Bands formed
See Musical groups established in 1984

Bands disbanded
See Musical groups disestablished in 1984

Bands reformed
Deep Purple*

Albums released

January–March

April–June

July–September

October–December

Release date unknown

1984 – Ebiet G. Ade
Acousticity - David Grisman
Aimless Love – John Prine
Animotion – Animotion
Akimbo Alogo – Kim Mitchell 
American Band-ages – Nash the Slash
The Art of Defense – Nona Hendryx
Back & Forth – Skinny Puppy
Born in Captivity – Roy Harper
Box of Frogs – Box of Frogs
Cal – Mark Knopfler – Soundtrack
Can't Wait All Night – Juice Newton
Caribbean Sunset – John Cale
Centipede – Rebbie Jackson
Change Your Mind – Raf
Cinema – Elaine Paige
Climate of Hunter – Scott Walker
Country Boy – Ricky Skaggs
Dali – Dalida
Dancin' on the Edge – Lita Ford
A Dancing Foot and a Praying Knee Don't Belong on the Same Leg – Scattered Order
E2-E4 – Manuel Göttsching
E.M.F – GG Allin
EB 84 – The Everly Brothers
Electric Eye – Prodigal
Every Man Has a Woman – Various Artists – Yoko Ono tribute
Faith – H2O
Fans – Malcolm McLaren
Flex-Able – Steve Vai
Folk of the 80s (Part III) – Men Without Hats
Fried – Julian Cope
Ghostbusters Soundtrack – Various Artists 
Glorious Results of a Misspent Youth – Joan Jett and the Blackhearts
Gone Fishin' – Flipper
The Grapes of Wrath – The Grapes of Wrath
Greatest Hits – Juice Newton
Greatest Love Classics – Andy Williams
Guardian Angel – The Shadows
Gum Tree Canoe - John Hartford
Heart Don't Lie – La Toya Jackson
Heart over Mind – Anne Murray
Heavy Heart – Carla Bley
Hits Out of Hell – Meat Loaf
Honeymoon Suite – Honeymoon Suite 
Horizen – Jade Warrior
How Will the Wolf Survive? – Los Lobos
I Often Dream of Trains – Robyn Hitchcock
If the Price is Right – Bonnie Pointer
Inside the Fire – Rita Coolidge
Intellectuals Are The Shoeshine Boys Of The Ruling Elite – Killdozer
It's All in the Game – Merle Haggard
The Las Vegas Story – The Gun Club
John Parr – John Parr (debut)
Knights of the New Thunder – TNT
Legend – Clannad (soundtrack)
Lights Out – Peter Wolf (debut)
Live at the Inferno – Raven

Mama – Becket
Mast Nazren -Ecstatic Glances Live in London, 1984 – Ghulam Ali
Meat Puppets II – Meat Puppets
Meeting in the Ladies Room – Klymaxx
Moving – The Raincoats
Nave Maria – Tom Zé
Neil's Heavy Concept Album – Nigel Planer
No Brakes – John Waite
No Kinda Dancer – Robert Earl Keen
Once in a Very Blue Moon – Nanci Griffith
Only You – Steve Monite
Opium – KMFDM (debut)
Optimystique – Yanni
Plain Dirt Fashion - Nitty Gritty Dirt Band
The Politics of Time – Minutemen
Pulling Rabbits Out of a Hat – Sparks
Reflexiones – José José
Read My Lips – Fee Waybill
Remote Luxury – The Church
Riders in the Sky, Live – Riders in the Sky
Rita Mitsouko – Rita Mitsouko
The Rock Connection – Cliff Richard
Scatology – Coil
Schizophrenic Circus - Red Rockers
Seasons – Dion DiMucci
Sonic Death – Sonic Youth
The Splendour of Fear – Felt
Starchild – Teena Marie
The Stockholm Concert, 1966 – Ella Fitzgerald and Duke Ellington
Straight Ahead – Amy Grant
The Strange Idols Pattern and Other Short Stories – Felt
These Things Happen – David Van Tieghem
Tocsin – Xmal Deutschland
Touch Sensitive – Bruce Foxton
United States Live – Laurie Anderson – Live
Velocity – The Vels
Victim in Pain – Agnostic Front (debut)
Vital Signs (White Heart album) – White Heart
The Voice – Bobby McFerrin
Youth Anthems for the New Order – Reagan Youth
Walking in the Shadow of the Big Man – Guadalcanal Diary
Walpurgis Night – Stormwitch
We Hate You South African Bastards! – Microdisney
When in Rome Do as The Vandals – The Vandals
Windows and Walls – Dan Fogelberg 
Wired to the Moon – Chris Rea
Wonderful World – Telex
Work Resumed on the Tower – News from Babel
World Shut Your Mouth – Julian Cope
You're Gettin' Even While I'm Gettin' Odd – The J. Geils Band (final album)

Biggest hit singles
The following songs achieved the highest chart positions
in the charts of 1984.

Top 40 Chart hit singles

Other Chart hit singles

Notable singles

Other Notable singles

Christmas songs
"Another Rock N' Roll Christmas" – Gary Glitter
"Do They Know It's Christmas?" – Band Aid
"Last Christmas" – Wham!
"Thank God It's Christmas" – Queen

Published popular music
 "After All These Years" w. Fred Ebb m. John Kander from the musical The Rink
 "The Cosby Show theme song" m. Stu Gardner and Bill Cosby
 "Cover Me" w.m. Bruce Springsteen
 "Every Time I Turn Around" w.m. Judy Hart Angelo & Gary Portnoy, theme from the TV series Punky Brewster
 "Friends" m. John Leffler, theme from the TV series Kate and Allie
 "Ghostbusters"     w.m. Ray Parker Jr.
 "Hallelujah" w.m. Leonard Cohen
 "I Just Called to Say I Love You"     w.m. Stevie Wonder
 "Let's Go Crazy" w.m. Prince and the Revolution
 "Like a Virgin" w.m. Billy Steinberg & Tom Kelly
 "Lights Out" w.m. Peter Wolf & Don Covay
 "Missing You" w.m. John Waite, Chaz Sanford & Mark Leonard
 "Murder, She Wrote theme song" m. John Addison
 "No More Lonely Nights" w.m. Paul McCartney
 "Rock You Like a Hurricane" w.m. Rudolf Schenker, Klaus Meine & Herman Rarebell
 "Time After Time" w.m. Cyndi Lauper & Rob Hyman
 "To All the Girls I've Loved Before" w. Hal David m. Albert Hammond
 "Wake Me Up Before You Go-Go" w.m. George Michael
 "What's Love Got To Do With It?" w.m. Terry Britten & Graham Lyle
 "When Doves Cry" w.m. Prince

Classical music
Samuel Adler – Sonata for viola and piano
Elliott Carter
Canon for 4, Homage to William, for flute, bass clarinet, violin and cello
Esprit rude/esprit doux, for flute and clarinet
Riconoscenza per Goffredo Petrassi, for violin
Brian Cherney – Into the Distant Stillness
George Crumb
A Haunted Landscape for orchestra
The Sleeper for soprano and piano
Mario Davidovsky – Divertimento for cello and orchestra
Peter Maxwell Davies – Symphony No. 3
Ludovico Einaudi – Altissimo
Lorenzo Ferrero 
My Blues
Ombres, for orchestra and live electronics
Frans Geysen
A + B = A/B, for keyboard instrument
Kataloog in grijs 1, for marimba
Late spiegels, for flute, oboe, piano and double bass
Omtrent a-b-c, for recorder quintet
Tonen-Trappenhuisje voor Hanne, for keyboard instrument
Twee orgels, for two organs
Karel Goeyvaerts
Aquarius-Tango, for piano
Zum Wassermann, for chamber orchestra (14 musicians)
De Zang van Aquarius, for 8 bass clarinets
Daron Hagen – A Walt Whitman Requiem
John Harbison – String Quartet no. 1
Robin Holloway – Concerto for Viola
Mauricio Kagel – Der Eid des Hippokrates, for piano 3 hands
Wojciech Kilar – Angelus, cantata for soprano, mixed choir and symphony orchestra
Ian McDougall – Concerto for Clarinet
Elizabeth Maconchy – String Quartet no. 13, Quartetto Corto
Ingram Marshall – Voces Resonae
Henri Pousseur
Chronique canine, for 2 pianos
Cortège des belles ténébreuses au jardin boréal, for cor anglais, viola, horn, tuba and 2 percussionists
L'étoile des langues, for narrators and 4 singers
Litanie du cristal des fleurs, for piano left hand
Litanie du miel matinal, for high melody instrument
Les noces d'Icare et de Mnémosyne, for variable forces
Patchwork des tribus américaines, for wind orchestra
Sixième vue sur les jardins interdits, for string trio
Sonate des maîtres viennois (‘Dicté par ... no.4’), for piano
Tango de Jeanne-la-Sibylle, for piano left hand
Steve Reich – The Desert Music
Wolfgang Rihm
Vorgefühle for orchestra
Schattenstück for orchestra
Fusées for orchestra
Blaubuch: String Quartet No. 6
 John Serry Sr. – Elegy for Organ
Tōru Takemitsu – riverrun for piano and orchestra
Robert Ward – Saxophone Concerto
Malcolm Williamson
A Pilgrim Liturgy – for soloists, mixed choir & orchestra
Cortège for a Warrior for orchestra
Hymna Titu for piano solo
Symphony No. 7

Ballet
See List of 1984 ballet premieres

Opera
Philip Glass 
Akhnaten
the CIVIL warS (Rome section)
Luigi Nono – Prometeo
Krzysztof Penderecki – The Black Mask
Peter Schickele – The Abduction of Figaro, attributed to P. D. Q. Bach.
Karlheinz Stockhausen – Samstag aus Licht (produced by La Scala, Milan)

Jazz

Musical theater
 Starlight Express – Andrew Lloyd Webber and Richard Stilgoe - London production opened and ran for 7.409 performances
 Forty-Second Street – London production
 The Rink – Broadway production opened at the Martin Beck Theatre on February 9 and ran for 233 performances
 Sunday in the Park with George (Stephen Sondheim) – Broadway production opened at the Booth Theatre on May 2 and ran for 604 performances.

Musical films
 Amadeus
 Asha Jyoti
 Beat Street
 Breakin'
 Breakin' 2: Electric Boogaloo
 Conexión Caribe
 The Cotton Club
 Footloose
 The Girl from Moonooloo, TV starring Jacki Weaver and David Atkins
 Give My Regards to Broad Street
 Hard to Hold
 The Muppets Take Manhattan
 Purple Rain
 Streets of Fire
 Sunny
 Then Sings My Soul
 This Is Spinal Tap

Births
January 2 – Jocelyn Oxlade, English-Filipino singer-songwriter and model (Kitty Girls)
January 9 – Drew Brown, American pop rock musician (OneRepublic)
January 17 –
Calvin Harris, Scottish electronic musician, DJ, producer (Taylor Swift, Rita Ora, Dua Lipa)
 Sharaya J, Hawaiian-born American female rapper and choreographer. 
January 18
Kristy Lee Cook, American Idol finalist
Benji Schwimmer, Winner of So You Think You Can Dance 2006
January 20 

 Toni Gonzaga, Filipina actress and singer
 Bonnie McKee, American singer-songwriter 
January 24 – Witold Kiełtyka, Polish musician (died 2007)
January 26 – Wu Qian, pianist
January 27 – Davetta Sherwood, American actress and singer
January 29 – Diana Rouvas, Australian singer-songwriter and The Voice Australia contestant, later winner   
January 30 – Kid Cudi, American rapper

February 9 – Han Geng, Chinese singer in Korea (Super Junior)
February 11 – Aubrey O'Day, American singer-songwriter, dancer and actress (Danity Kane, Dumblonde)
February 12 – Jamie Scott, English singer-songwriter
February 14 – Víkingur Ólafsson, Icelandic pianist
February 15 – Dorota Rabczewska, Polish singer and model
February 18 – Daniel Cohen, Israeli conductor, music director and violinist
February 20 – Audra Mae, American singer-songwriter 
February 23 – Grieves,  American hip hop artist 
February 25 – Lovefoxxx (Cansei de Ser Sexy)
February 26 – Natalia Lafourcade,  Mexican pop-rock singer and songwriter
February 29 – Kiyoe Yoshioka, Japanese singer (ikimono-gakari)
March 3 – Tim Maddren, New Zealand entertainer (Hi-5)
March 9 – Priscilla Ahn,  American singer, songwriter and multi-instrumentalist.
March 18 – Vonzell Solomon, US singer
March 20 – Christy Carlson Romano, American actress and singer
March 24 – Evan Felker,  American singer-songwriter and guitarist
March 25 – Katharine McPhee, American Idol finalist, American singer and actress
March 26 – Stéphanie Lapointe, Canadian singer
March 31 – Jack Antonoff, American musician, multi instrumentalist, singer-songwriter and record producer. (Taylor Swift (1989 onwards), Lorde (Melodrama, Solar Power),  St. Vincent (Masseduction, Daddy's Home),  Lana Del Rey(NFR, Chemtrails Over The Country Club), Florence And The Machine-Dance Fever, Member of Bleachers, Fun.)
April 3 – Chrissie Fit, American actress and singer
April 6 – Max Bemis, American musician (Say Anything)
April 7 – Belly (rapper),  Palestinian-Jordanian-Canadian[1] rapper, singer, songwriter and record producer.

April 8 - Andrew Huang (musician),  Canadian YouTube personality, musician, music producer, video producer and music teacher 
April 10 – Mandy Moore, American singer-songwriter, actress and musician
April 14 – Adán Sánchez, American-Mexican musician (d. 2004)
April 22 – Amelle Berrabah, British singer (Sugababes)
April 23 - Lil Eazy-E, American rapper
April 24 – Tyson Ritter American singer/songwriter of (The All-American Rejects)
April 27 – Patrick Stump, American singer, songwriter and musician (Fall Out Boy)
May 1 – Keiichiro Koyama, Japanese singer (NEWS) and actor
May 2 
 Rose Falcon, American singer-songwriter
 James Brooks (electronic musician), Canadian-American EDM artist
May 3 – Cheryl Burke, American dancer, model and TV host.
May 4 – Little Boots, British, singer, Musician, DJ, record producer, songwriter
May 5 – Wade MacNeil, Canadian guitarist
May 10 – Pe'er Tasi, Israeli singer
May 11 – Gerald Clayton, Dutch-American pianist and composer (The Clayton Brothers)
May 14 – Olly Murs, English, singer-songwriter, television presenter and X Factor competitor 
May 15 – Mr Probz, Dutch singer, musician and actor (Robin Schulz)
May 17 – Passenger, English singer-songwriter 
May 25
Marion Raven, Norwegian singer-songwriter (M2M)
Nikolai Pokotylo, Russian 
May 27 – Rachel Parris, British comedian, musician and singer 
May 29 – Ina Wroldsen, Norwegian singer-songwriter
June 4 – Rainie Yang, Taiwanese singer
June 17 – John Gallagher, Jr., American actor, singer and dancer
June 23 – Duffy, Welsh singer-songwriter
June 29 
Han Ji-hye, Korean actress/singer
June 30 – Fantasia Barrino, American singer
July 1 – Jason Reeves (songwriter), American singer-songwriter and musician
July 4
Gina Glocksen, American Idol finalist
Stix Izza, American musician
July 5 – Elisabeth Schwarz,  Austrian operatic soprano.
July 7 – Marie-Mai, Canadian singer
July 9 – Jacob Hoggard, Canadian singer/lead singer of Hedley
July 12 
 Gareth Gates, English singer
 Jack Conte, American musician 
July 15 – Vice Cooler, American singer-songwriter (Hawnay Troof and XBXRX)
July 17 – Asami Kimura, Japanese singer
July 21 – Blake Lewis, American Idol runner- up
July 24
Dhani Lennevald (A*Teens)
Tyler Kyte, Canadian actor/singer
July 25 – Dong-Hyek Lim, pianist
July 26 – Alex Parks, English singer-songwriter
July 30 – Gina Rodriguez, American actress, rapper, dancer, model, writer, producer and director.
August 3 
 Carah Faye Charnow, American singer for the band Shiny Toy Guns
 Whitney Duncan, American country music singer and songwriter, Survivor Contestant 
August 5 
Helene Fischer, Soviet-born German singer
Taylor Locke (Rooney)
August 21
Alizée,  French singer, dancer and voice actress.
Melissa Schuman, singer (Dream)
August 24 – Yesung, Korean singer (Super Junior)
August 31 – Will Martin, New Zealand-born classical crossover singer
September – Di Wu, Chinese-American pianist
September 1 – Joe Trohman, American musician
September 3 - Garrett Hedlund, American actor, model and singer
September 10 – How To Dress Well, Tom Krell, American singer-songwriter 
September 16
Sabrina Bryan, American actress and singer
Katie Melua, Georgian-British singer, songwriter and musician
September 18 – Jimmy Napes, English songwriter and record producer
September 22 – Theresa Fu, Hong Kong singer and actress
September 23 – Louie Stephens, American rock keyboardist (Rooney)
September 26 – Keisha Buchanan, English singer-songwriter (Sugababes)
September 27 – Avril Lavigne, Canadian rock singer-songwriter, voice actress and musician
September 28 – Melody Thornton, American singer-songwriter, dancer and television personality (Pussycat Dolls)
October 3 – Ashlee Simpson, American singer-songwriter, actress
October 4 – Lena Katina, Russian singer (t.A.T.u.)
October 8 – Emily Williams, New Zealand singer, songwriter and actress 
October 10 – Stephanie Cheng, Cantopop Hong Kong singer
October 12 – Matthew Dewey, Australian composer
October 15 – Jessie Ware, English singer and songwriter
October 16 – Shayne Ward, English singer and winner of reality TV show The X Factor
October 25
Sara Lumholdt (A*Teens)
Katy Perry, American singer/songwriter, advocate
October 27 – Kelly Osbourne, American singer
October 29 – Chris Baio, American musician (Vampire Weekend)
November 2 – Anastasia Karpova, Russian singer 
November 6 – Patina Miller, American actress and singer
November 9
Delta Goodrem, Australian singer-songwriter, writer, musician, philanthropist and actress
Se7en, South Korean singer

November 12 – Sandara Park, member of South Korean girl group 2NE1, previously actress
November 14 – Luiz Filipe Coelho, violinist
November 18 – Johnny Christ, American heavy metal rock bassist (Avenged Sevenfold)
November 21 
Lindsey Haun, American actress and singer
Willy Mason, American singer-songwriter
November 22 – Scarlett Johansson, American singer and actress
November 25 - Bo Bruce, Lady Catherine Anna Brudenell-Bruce, known as Bo Bruce, is an English singer-songwriter 
November 28 – Trey Songz, American singer
December 12 – Gabrielle Ruiz, American actress, Broadway performer and musician (Crazy Ex-Girlfriend) 
December 15 – Joshua Hayward, English rock guitarist (The Horrors)
December 17
Asuka Fukuda, Japanese singer
Mikky Ekko, American singer
December 18 – Julia Holter, American singer, songwriter, record producer, composer and artist
December 20 – David Tavaré, Spanish singer
December 22 – Jonas Altberg, Swedish singer, record producer and DJ
December 23 – Alison Sudol, American singer-songwriter, actress and writer
December 24 - Jehnny Beth, a French musician, singer-songwriter, producer, presenter and actress (half of the duo John & Jehn and front woman of the English rock band Savages) 
December 25 – The Veronicas (Lisa and Jess Origliasso) Australian singer-songwriters, activists, musicians and advocates
December 30
Andra Day, American singer and songwriter
Dalia Stasevska, Ukrainian-born Finnish conductor
Unknown – DY, Canadian rapper
 Troy Kingi, A New Zealand actor and musician
 Cassandra Jenkins, American musician, singer and songwriter based in Brooklyn, New York, United States.
 Dana Stephensen,  Australian ballet dancer. She is a soloist of The Australian Ballet.

Deaths
January 1 – Alexis Korner, blues musician, 55 (lung cancer)
January 18 – Vassilis Tsitsanis, Greek composer, 69
January 21 – Jackie Wilson, singer, 49 (pneumonia)
January 23 – Samuel Gardner, violinist and composer, 92
January 30 – Luke Kelly, member of The Dubliners, 43 (brain tumour)
February 1 – Ada "Bricktop" Smith, singer and dancer, 89
February 15
Avon Long, American actor and singer, 73
Ethel Merman, singer and actress, 76
March 9 – Imogen Holst, conductor and composer, 76
April 1 – Marvin Gaye, singer/songwriter, 44 (gunshot)
April 6
Jimmy Kennedy, Irish-born British songwriter, 81
Hryhory Kytasty, composer, 77
April 20 – Mabel Mercer, cabaret singer, 84
April 23 – Juan Tizol, trombonist and composer, 84
April 26 – Count Basie, jazz musician, 79
April 27 – Z.Z. Hill, blues singer, 48
May 1 – Gordon Jenkins, US conductor, songwriter and pianist, 73
May 29 – Sanford Gold, jazz pianist, 72
June – Mohamed Mooge Liibaan, singer and instrumentalist
June 8 – Gordon Jacob, composer, 88
June 15 – Meredith Willson, US songwriter, 82
June 28 – Mischa Spoliansky, Russian born composer and conductor
July 4 – Jimmie Spheeris, American singer-songwriter, 34
July 14
Bill Stapleton, jazz trumpeter, 49 (alcohol-related)
Philippé Wynne, R&B singer, 43
July 19 – Madeleine Sibille, operatic soprano, 89
July 25 – Big Mama Thornton, R&B singer, 57
July 29 – Lorenz Fehenberger, operatic tenor, 71
July 31 – Paul Le Flem, composer, 103
August 4 – Babe Russin, saxophonist, 73
August 5 – Tuts Washington, R&B pianist, 67
August 12 – Margaret Sutherland, composer, 86
August 30 – Emil Newman, conductor and composer, 73
August 31 – Carlo Zecchi, pianist, music teacher and conductor, 81
September 3
Dora Labbette, operatic soprano, 86
Arthur Schwartz, composer and film producer, 83
September 6 – Ernest Tubb, country & western musician, 70
September 10
Herman Sherman, jazz saxophonist and bandleader, 61
Trummy Young, swing trombonist, 72
September 15 – Charles Lynch, Irish concert pianist, 77
September 20 – Steve Goodman, singer/songwriter best known for "City of New Orleans", 36 (leukaemia)
October 3 
Lina Bruna Rasa, operatic soprano, 67
Harrison Potter, pianist, 93
October 4 – Carl von Garaguly, violinist and conductor
October 12 – Jesús María Sanromá, pianist, 81
October 16 – Jiří Jelínek, jazz trumpeter, singer and artist, 62
October 20 – Budd Johnson, jazz musician, 73
October 26 – John Woods Duke, composer, 85
November 8 – Carl Gustav Sparre Olsen, violinist and composer, 81
November 16 – Leonard Rose, cellist, 66
November 20 – Alexander Moyzes, Slovak composer, 78
December 7 – Jon B. Higgins, American Carnatic musician, 45 (road accident)
December 9
Ivor Moreton, British pianist, singer and composer, 76
Razzle (Nicholas Dingley), drummer of Hanoi Rocks, 24 (car accident)
December 10 – Charlie Teagarden, jazz trumpeter, 71
December 13 – Max Schönherr, conductor and composer, 81
December 15 – Jan Peerce, operatic tenor, 80
December 21 – José Luis Rodríguez Vélez, Panamanian composer, orchestra director, saxophonist, clarinetist and guitarist, 69
December 25 – Ron Tabak, lead singer of Prism, 31

Awards

Grammy Awards
Grammy Awards of 1984

Country Music Association Awards
1984 Country Music Association Awards

Eurovision Song Contest
Eurovision Song Contest 1984

Charts

List of no. 1 hits
List of Hot 100 number-one singles of 1984 (U.S.)
Cashbox Top 100 number-one singles of 1984
List of number-one singles from the 1980s (UK)

List of no. 1 albums
List of number-one albums of 1984 (U.S.)

See also
 1984 in heavy metal music
 1984 in country music
 1984 in British music
 Record labels established in 1984
 Timeline of musical events
 1984
Ronald Reagan in music

References

 
20th century in music
Music by year